Roman Zawiliński (1855 in Brzeziny (now in Subcarpathian Voivodeship) – 12 October 1932 in Kraków) was a Polish linguist, pedagogue and ethnographer. The founder and editor of Poradnik Językowy.

His main fields of study was Lesser Polish dialect, didactics, Polish language grammar, ethnography, synonyms dictionary. Author of publications Brzeziniacy (1881), Dobór wyrazów. Słownik wyrazów bliskoznacznych i jednoznacznych... (1926).

References
 
 

1855 births
1932 deaths
Polish educators
Polish ethnographers
Grammarians from Poland
Linguists from Poland